The 1920 Major League Baseball season was contested from April 14 to October 12, 1920. The Brooklyn Robins and Cleveland Indians were the regular season champions of the National League and American League, respectively. The Indians then defeated the Robins in the World Series, five games to two.

This was the final season to be presided over by the three-person National Baseball Commission, which ran the major and minor leagues—composed of the American League President, National League President, and one team owner as president. In the wake of the Black Sox scandal, the credibility of baseball had been tarnished with the public and fans and the owners of the teams clamored for credibility to be restored. The owners felt that creating one position with near-unlimited authority was the answer. After the season, the commission was replaced with the newly created office of Commissioner of Baseball.

Each team had a 154-game regular season schedule, consisting of 22 games against the seven other teams in the same league.

Standings

American League

National League

Postseason

Bracket

Managers

American League

National League

Creation of the office of the Commissioner of Baseball
Persisting rumors of the Chicago White Sox throwing the previous year's World Series to the Cincinnati Reds and another game during the 1920 season led to the game's brass looking for ways of dealing with the problems of gambling within the sport.  At the time, MLB was governed by a three-man National Baseball Commission composed of American League President Ban Johnson, National League President John Heydler and Cincinnati Reds owner Garry Herrmann.  At the request of the other owners, Herrmann left the office reducing the Commission to be deadlocked by two.  With the owners disliking one or both presidents, calls began for stronger leadership, although they opined they could support the continuation of the leagues' presidencies with a well-qualified Commissioner.

A plan that began to circulate and gain support was dubbed the "Lasker Plan," after Albert Lasker, a shareholder of the Chicago Cubs, called for a three-man commission with no financial interest in baseball.  With the Black Sox scandal exposed on September 30, 1920, Heydler began calling for the Lasker Plan.  All eight NL teams supported the plan, along with three AL teams.  The three AL teams were the White Sox, the New York Yankees and the Boston Red Sox.  The teams in support of the Lasker Plan wanted federal judge Kenesaw Mountain Landis to take the office of Baseball Commissioner.   Johnson, who opposed the plan and thus, the appointment of Landis, had allies in the other five AL clubs, and attempted to get Minor League Baseball to side with him.  However, the minor leagues would not, and when the AL teams learned their position, they relented and instead went along with the Lasker Plan.  The owners agreed that they needed a person with near-unlimited authority and a powerful person to fill the position of commissioner.

The owners approached Landis, who eventually accepted the position as the first Commissioner of Baseball.  He drafted the agreement which gave him almost unlimited authority throughout the major and minor leagues – every owner on down to the batboys was accountable to the Commissioner – including barring owners from dismissing him, speaking critically of him in public or challenging him in court.  He also kept his job as a federal judge.  Of course, a near autocratic leader was probably what was needed for baseball at the time as the Black Sox scandal had placed the public's trust in baseball on shaky ground as the owners accepted the terms of the agreement with a scant trace of opposition, if any.

Effect of the Black Sox scandal on the AL pennant race
After an August 31 game between the Philadelphia Phillies and Chicago Cubs, allegations began to arise that the game was fixed.      The state court in Chicago opened a grand jury to investigate gambling within baseball.  Gambler Billy Maharg came forward with information that he worked with New York gambler Arnold Rothstein and former boxer Abe Attell to get the White Sox to throw the 1919 World Series.  The White Sox again were contending for the American League title and were in a near-dead heat with the Cleveland Indians and New York Yankees.  However, on September 28, eight White Sox players were indicted and suspended by owner Charlie Comiskey.  The Indians pulled ahead and won the pennant by two games over the White Sox.

References

Bibliography

External links
1920 Major League Baseball season schedule at Baseball Reference

 
Major League Baseball seasons